Obono is a surname. Notable people with the surname include:

Danièle Obono (born 1980), Gabonese-French politician
Elena Obono (born 1999), Equatoguinean footballer
Luz Milagrosa Obono (born 1996), Equatoguinean footballer
Trifonia Melibea Obono (born 1982), Equatoguinean novelist, political scientist, academic, and LGBTQI+ activist